The 2013 New York Red Bulls season was the club's eighteenth season in Major League Soccer, the top division of American soccer.

Team uniform

Background

Squad
As of August 30, 2013.

Player management

Transfers

In

Out

Statistics

Appearances and goals

 [L] = Left team during the season.

Top scorers

Starting 11

Competitions

Pre-season 
Kickoff times are in EDT

Desert Diamond Cup

Standings

Matches 
Kickoff times are in EDT

Major League Soccer

League table

Eastern Conference standings

Results Summary

Results by round

Match results 
Kickoff times are in EDT

MLS Cup

Bracket

Matches 
Kickoff times are in EDT

U.S. Open Cup 

Kickoff times are in EDT

Awards and recognition

MLS Player of the Week

MLS Goal of the Week

MLS Save of the Week

See also 
 2013 in American soccer
 2013 Major League Soccer season

References 

New York Red Bulls
New York Red Bulls
Red bulls
New York Red Bulls seasons
2013